Estadio Municipal "Zorros del Desierto" de Calama is a football stadium in Calama, Chile.  It is the home field of the Cobreloa football team and sometimes used by Chile national football team to serve as home ground.

Built in 1952 by the Abaroa family to provide sports facilities for the city, it was demolished in 2013 and opened in 2015, it replaced the old Estadio Municipal de Calama. The stadium seats 12,346 people and includes zones for disabled people. The Stadium was built to FIFA Standards and logistics.

This stadium was cited as one of the best in the world in 2015 by the Database of Stadiums page. The stadium was considered the smallest and least expensive among the participants. It finished in 19th place with 14,837 points.

The former mayor of Calama, Esteban Velasquez, said that the maintenance costs are 300 million CLP, mainly directed to the maintenance of the court, dependencies and officials working in the enclosure. It is fully funded by the Municipality. Cobreloa paid a commission to the Municipality of around 800.000 CLP per month to help in maintenance of the stadium through May 2016.

Name
The first stadium name proposal was to honour former Cobreloa player Fernando Cornejo, who died in 2009. It became the name of the stadium project in 2010. However, this project name was not given to the stadium.

In April 2014, in a reunion between local authorities, it was decided that the name would be chosen by Calama mayor, Esteban Velazquez, and the Consejo de Sociedad Civil (Cososi). The proposed alternatives were: Arena, Pucará, Vicente Cantatore, Mario Lira and Fernando Cornejo.

Ultimately, the name was decided through voting, through a campaign called "Ponle nombre al Municipal de Calama". With a video titled 'Corporación de Cultura y Turismo de Calama', the municipality invited the community of Calama, Chile to propose names. Initially seven names were proposed, but the registration period was extended in September 2014. Eventually 4,721 voters chose among 14 proposals. The winner was the 'Zorros del Desierto' option, with 1,088 votes. The second, the third and the fourth place were used to name different areas of the stadium. The Mario Lira Option was named the media cabines.

History

Proposal 
A new stadium in Calama was first suggested in 2007, when architect, Andrés Valle, made a model of the project; it was well received by the authorities. This showed that the community and the private sector had interest in a new venue. In 2008, Cobreloa representative Gerardo Mella proposed the project to authorities of Calama. With the consultation of the company Alberto Saltori y Asociados, Cobreloa would dedicate CLP 35 to 40 million to this project.

In 2009, Chilean, President Michelle Bachelet announced the inclusion of Calama in the third phase of the 'Estadios Bicentenario' projects. Representative Marcos Espinoza had referred to the project financing with an amount of CLP 300 million, either for a renovation or a new structure.

In 2010, parliamentarian Marcos Espinoza announced to the media the possibility that this project would be not included in the 2011 budget. In 2011, Chilean President Sebastián Piñera announced that $170 million U.S. dollars was to be invested in improving the infrastructure of Chile's stadiums through the 'Chilestadios' project, in which the Estadio Municipal de Calama was included.

The ultimate project was shown to Calama mayor, Estebán Velásquez Nuñez, in 2012. In this phase of the project the Consejo Regional was decided as the amounts would be distributed. The Instituto Nacional del Deporte (IND) allocated CLP 5,000 million to the project. The technical team of the municipality of Calama led by Gloria Aliaga was in charge of different project phases.

The municipality of Calama had to deposit the project to the Banco Integrado de 'Proyectos del Ministerio de Planificación Social'. The resource allocation of the 'Fondo Regional of Desarrollo Social' was subtracted by the 'Consejo Regional' of Antofagasta Region to enter the tendering.

The proposal was for a concrete structure with 12,000 individual seats, including a place for disabled people. The project had 4 floors, with dressing room for the players and referees, hygienic services, snack hall, media area, first aid hall and LED screen. The field dimensions were 105 x 68 meters with natural grass. The design was inspired by the aging copper bars in order to provide identification to the community in the area.

In 2012 non-compliance to bidding rules delayed construction, which is why the 'Instituto Nacional del Deporte' had to seek alternatives to avoid altering the route of the process.

Construction 
The project was awarded to Spanish company Isolux Corsan on January 30, 2013. The dismantling works started the same day with the removal of stadium light bulbs. The last game in the old venue was held in the old stadium was against Deportes Iquique, on February 3, 2013. In April of this year, the 'Instituto Nacional del Deporte' and the 'Gobierno Regional' increased project financing to CLP 12,000 million approximately.

By November 2013, progress reached only 40%. The revised completion date was the end of the first quarter of 2014.

2014 
In April progress reached 85% and regional governor Valentín Volta said the stadium would finish in the second half of the year.

In May salaries to company employees went unpaid over delays. In July payments to workers of Isolux – Corsan were delayed. for September, it was announced that the new stadium it will be opened in November this year, due to delays in municipal delivery of this. Due to delays and a failure to cover outstanding debts to its subcontractors, Isolux-Corsan ran into difficulties. The new completion date was early 2015.

Then-Chile National Football coach, Jorge Sampaoli, had planned to use the stadium for matches with Brazil and Argentina in the 2018 FIFA World Cup qualification.

2015 
In February 2015 delays came over the bathrooms, which were not complete. The opening date of the stadium was April 18.

The 'Instituto Nacional del Deporte' donated an amount greater than CLP 200 million to finish the work. This money was given for improved protection bars, ticket offices, bathrooms, illuminations, boilers and elevator. These improvements were to finish in 2016.

First Match 
On April 18 the stadium's first match was between Cobreloa and Deportes Antofagasta, for the Primera División de Chile Match in the fifteenth game-week, at 16:00 (GMT-3). Cobreloa won the match with goals by Diego Silva (6'), Rodolfo González (21') y José Luis Jiménez (58').Attendance came to 10,200 spectators. The referee of this match was Eduardo Gamboa.

Cobreloa entered the field with the following Line-Up:

Line-Up:

  Sebastián Contreras
  Diego Silva
  Martín Zbrun
  Rodolfo González
  Miguel Sanhueza
  Eric Ahumada
  Gustavo Cristaldo
  Cristián Gaitán
  José Pérez
  José Luis Jiménez
  Álvaro López
  Coach: Marco Antonio Figueroa

Certification
The Departamento Prevención de Riesgo Forestal y Ambiente (O.S-5), that regulates security standards of the stadiums of Chile determined on March 23, 2016 that this stadium meets these standards, being a stadium suitable for large-scale events, meeting 63% of the requirements.

LaMia Flight 2933 Reaction

On December 4, 2016, Club de Deportes Cobreloa, decided to make a tribute to the victims of LaMia Flight 2933, in which personnel of Associação Chapecoense de Futebol team, journalists of Brazil and Bolivian air crew with 77 killed. This tribute consisted of a drawing of the logo of the team in the middle of the field. Before the match a minute of silence paid tribute to the victims. Cobreloa wore a commemorative jersey with the Chapecoense logo below the team logo. The LED screen showed the Chapecoense logo over Cobreloa and his rival logo Intermittently .

Design
The concept of the stadium is based on mining, which is the area's principal economic activity. The roof of the stadium shows copper bars.

The stadium is built of concrete. The front cover is made with steel (coated with weathering steel) to give the stadium a copper-aged look and an anti-corrosive surface. Initially a copper membrane was proposed for the lining of the stadium. The idea was abandoned absent a Chilean manufacturer and the ultimate green color of the material.

The stadium lighting includes 16 light posts place on the interior of the deck, making it suitable for high definition video. The front of the stadium has changing decorative lights.

The evacuation routes are painted with yellow in the steps and risers of the stadium with enlarged size of this.

Other uses
The stadium is home to various recreational and cultural activities, where children shared participate in family races, yoga and Zumba sessions. In 2016 this stadium hosted the Campeonato Nacional Canadela, Senior category.

In March 2016, the local sport club called Los rebeldes organized a charity event to deliver nonperishable food to different organizations of the city, this event consisted in a football match between some players of Cobreloa in the 1980s decade versus Deportes Ovalle historics players, the requirement to enter at the event was donate a nonperishable food to the cause.

On November 20, 2016, the stadium was host of the first final of Bubble bump football tournament in Chile, called Fútbol burbuja Cup. The participants of this event were secondary students.

Facilities

Stands

West Stand Tribuna Pácifico 'Fernando Cornejo Jiménez'. 
Capacity: 2.772 seatings
The west stand of the stadium was named in honor of the former captain of Cobreloa, Fernando Cornejo Jiménez. This player won with Cobreloa team the Chilean Championships in four times, 1992, 2003 (A), 2003 (C) and 2004 . He played in Chile national football team. He participated in the 1998 FIFA World Cup in France.

After his retirement, he became the football manager of the youth Cobreloa team. He died in 2009 from gastric cancer.

This stand has 3 sections, including 214 VIP seats. The press stands and the snacks shop sector are located over this stand.

South Gallery 'Corazón de Minero'. 
Capacity: 2.674 seatings
This gallery was named in honor of the nickname of Fernando Cornejo, 'Corazón de Minero, in a poll held in Calama, this was the third option in a communal poll to decide the name of the stadium.

He played for Ohiggins de Rancagua and Cobreloa. The nickname has been used since 1992, when Radio Carillon broadcaster Epifanio Carle Alcayaga used it. The reason for his nickname is due to the great identification he had with the area of Calama and the miners.

Cobreloa supporters called 'Huracán Naranja' sit In this gallery.

The LED Screen is located in this gallery.

East Stand Tribuna Ándes 'Héroes del Topater' 
Capacity: 3.948 seatings
This stand was named in honor of the Chilean soldiers who fought and died in the Battle of Topater, fought in Calama on March 23, 1879, starting the Guerra del Pacifico. This event is celebrated by the city of Calama as the day of annexation of the city to the Chilean territory. The Topater Monolith remembers the fallen heroes of this battle. Cobreloa fans sit in this gallery.

North Gallery: 'Río Loa' 
Capacity: 2.758 seatings
This stand was named in honor of the Loa River, the longest river in Chile. It crosses the city of Calama. It is the livelihood for indigenous communities of Atacama. Visiting team supporters sit in this gallery.

Facilities
 Press Room 'Mario Lira Solas': Named in honor of the social communicator and former councilor of Calama, born in Chuquicamata (1953–2013), Mario Lira Solas. He worked as a press correspondent for Cobreloa. He was also a municipal official.
 Utility Room 'Luis Becerra Constanzo': Named in honor of a stagehand of Cobreloa, who worked with the club for over 20 years (1981–2011). His ashes were scattered on the floor of the Estadio Municipal de Calama, at a ceremony where hundreds of people participated.
 Press Stands 'Alfredo Llewellyn Bustos': Named in honor of the social communicator who was a well-known fan of Cobreloa.
 2 Professionals Dressing Room
 2 Amateur Dressing Room
 8 Radio Stands and 2 TV Stands
 634 m2 of Snacks Shop
 753 m2 of General Public Bathrooms
 Possibility space to museum and fan shop: 133 113 m2
 4,434 m2 of Stadium roofing
 28 m2 of LED Screen
 105×68 m. Dimension field with natural grass and irrigation technology

Records

Cobreloa

Transport and access

The stadium is accessible on transit bus of the city, more specifically the bus line 'Empresa de Transporte Publico Linea 177 Calama' in his '177-fe' service, who works on hollyday, who going through 'Matta Avenue', located on northeast sector of the city, near of 'Bilbao' street.

See also

List of football stadiums in Chile
Club de Deportes Cobreloa

References

External links

Profile of Estadio Zorros del Desierto At StadiumDB
 Profile at Soccerway
 Profile at Diseño Arquitectura
 Official Cobreloa Page

2015 establishments in Chile
Zorros del Desierto
Zorros del Desierto
Sports venues completed in 2015